The Golden-Haired Children is a Turkish fairy tale collected by folklorist Ignác Kúnos. It is related to the theme of the Calumniated Wife and is classified in the Aarne-Thompson-Uther Index as tale type ATU 707, "The Three Golden Children".

Sources
The tale was first translated into Hungarian by Kúnos with the title Az aranyhajú gyermekek. It was later translated into German as Die goldhaarigen Kinder.

Summary
In a kingdom, long ago, a woodcutter's three daughters work with sewing and stitching from morning till night, selling their work in the marketplace. One day, however, the padishah of the city bans lighting candles at night, for a period of three days and three nights. The sisters, trying to earn their living, continue their activities by candlelight and cover their house with a thick curtain.

On the third night, the padishah decides to check if his people are following the ban. He passes by the house of the three sisters, who are talking among themselves: the eldest wants to marry the royal cook to eat delicious dishes, and claims she can weave a large carpet for the padishah; the middle one the keeper of the royal wardrobe so she can wear fine clothes and claims can weave a large tent for the padishah, and the third sister to the padishah himself, for she promises to bear him twins with golden hair: the male with the symbol of a half-moon on the front, and the female with a bright star on the temples.

The padishah brings the first two sisters to prove their extraordinary claims to him, fail, and are sent back to their poor house. The youngest sister marries him. The two sister stop by the palace gates and bribe an old woman ("the devil's own daughter") to interfere with the birth of their nephews.

The third sister gives birth to their wonder children with the astronomical birthmarks, "that darkness was turned to light when they were by". The old woman steals the babies, replace them for pups and casts the pair into a stream. They are washed away to another region. Meanwhile, an old man grazes with his she-goat, which returns milkless. The man notices and follows the she-goat, which leads him to the twins. The man takes them to his wife and adopts both as their children.

Years pass and the old couple dies. The girl spends her days at home while her brother goes hunting. One day, the boy, now a youth, meets the padishah on a hunt. The padishah feels a unexplained longing to embrace the boy as his son. He returns to the palace, growing ill with longing, and the old woman notices. She goes to the old couple's house and talks to the girl. The old woman convinces her to send her brother for the garden of the Queen of the Peris (Die Feekönigin or The Fairy Queen, in other translations) and find a branch.

The boy goes on the quest and meets the Mother of Devils, who advises him on how to get the branch. He finds the branch (a twig with little leaves, each leave with a little bird singing a song) and brings it home.

Seeing the boy's first success, the old woman returns and tells the girl of the Queen's magic mirror. He finds the Mother of Devils again and she tells him on how to enter the palace and get the mirror: he shall find two doors - open the closed one and shut the open one; he shall find a lion and a sheep - put the correct fodder in front of them; he shall find two furnaces - put out the burning one and heat up the furnace with ashes. The Boy follows the instructions, passes the garden and enters the palace. He steals the mirror, and a "mighty voice" alerts the Queen of the Peris. The Queen commands the furnaces, the animals and the doors to impede his escape, but since the boy has been kind to them, the objects and animals disobey their mistress.

The boy returns with the mirror. The old woman returns to the humble house and tells the girl to have the Queen of the Peris herself. The brother returns to the Mother of Devils, who tells him to cross a desert, pass by a large cypress wood with a tomb housing the petrified bodies of those who failed, go to her palace and shout at the top of his lungs for the Queen of the Peris. The boy follows her instructions, but the Queen of the Peris is victorious and petrifies the boy with her magic powers. However, the Queen takes pity on the boy, gets a saucer, fills with "diamond water" and sprinkles it on the boy, restoring him to life. The boy tells her he came to seek her, and she consents to return with him from "the Country of the Peris". The boy also convinces her to restore the petrified men in the tomb.

After his return, the boy marries the Queen of the Peris. She tells him the will find the padishah on his hunt and that he will invite the boy to his palace, but he should decline this invitation. It happens as she predicts. The next day, the Queen summons her Black lala and commands him to fetch her father's steed and give to her human husband, so that he can go to the palace and invite the padishah this time.

Meanwhile, the Queen of the Peris rescues her mother-in-law from her cruel punishment (being half-buried in the ground) and commands the house to be transformed into a palace. The padishah pays them a visit, sees the brother and the sister, the Queen of the Peris and his wife, and learns of the whole truth.

Analysis

Tale type 
Folklorists and tale collectors Wolfram Eberhard and Pertev Naili Boratav listed 41 variants in their joint work (Catalogue of Turkish Folktales), grouped under the banner Die Schöne or Güzel ("The Beautiful"), numbered 239 in the Typen Turkischer Volksmärchen (TTV). As such, the tale was one of "the most frequent folktales" in Turkish sources. A further study lists at least 55 versions of the story, with other ten variants collected and archived in Uysal–Walker Archive of Turkish Oral Narrative.

Motifs 
Part of the Turkish variants show two heroes and follow the Brother Quests for a Bride format: the aunts' helper (witch, maid, midwife, slave) suggests her brother brings home a woman of renowned beauty, who becomes his wife at the end of the story and, due to her supernatural powers, acquits her mother-in-law of any perceived wrongdoing in the king's eyes. In some variants, the maiden (named Gülükan or Dilaremcengi) accompanies the Brother; in others, a male character joins the twins and reveals the whole truth.

In some of the Turkish variants, the name of the character may be Dilâlem-çengi, Dilâver-çengi, Dilâzar-çengi, Cengiz-Daughter, Çenginar. Regarding a tale he published, orientalist Otto Spies explained that the word Çengi means "female dancer", and dilaver "brave, valiant".

Variants

Cengidilaver
In the tale Cengidilaver, the tale begins with the sultan's queen giving birth to twin children, a boy and a girl, who are replaced for puppies and cast into the water by another woman that lived in the sultan's palace. The sultana is condemned by her husband to be buried in the ground up to the neck, and her children are saved by a poor miller. Sixteen years pass, and after the miller dies, the twin children, now homeless, wander around, until the sister finds some stones on the ground and picks them up. They meet a jeweler and ask for shelter. The jeweler adopts them and they live together with money from the stones. One day, the sultan's second wife sends the brother on a quest for the rosebush and the nightingale of a man being Cengidilaver, and finally for the man himself. The third time the brother visits Cengidilaver, he disenchants the creature. In return, Cengidilaver, now a normal man, thanks the brother and gives him the former sultana's golden ring, advising him to invite the king for dinner with the twins. This tale was originally collected by German orientalist  with the title Die goldhaarigen Zwillingskinder ("The Twin Children With Golden Hair").

Tschan-Kuschu, Tschor-Kuschu
In a tale collected by folklorist Pertev Boratav from his own mother with the title "Чан-Кушу, Чор-Кушу" ("Tschan-Kuschu, Tschor-Kuschu", Turkish: Çan-Kuşu, Çor-Kuşu), the padishah forbids using candles at night. One house still does and he goes to investigate: he sees three sisters talking, the two oldest boasting they can weave a large tent and cloth, and the youngest promising to bear twins, boy and girl, with golden curls. The padishah marries the first two, who fail to deliver their boasts, and finally the youngest. She bears him the twins, who are replaced by the midwife. They are found and reared by a dervish. One day, the padishah sees the pair in the mountains and sighs that they could have been his children. The midwife and the sisters plan to eliminate the twins by sending them after "a thing that dances and plays". He is to go to another country, near a palace, knock on the door with a jasmine twig and answer "Chan-Kushu", while a voice on the other side cries out: "Chor-Kushu". The Brother fails in this repartee, and his Sister comes to rescue him: She knocks on the door with the jasmine twig. An arap appears; she beats him into submission and commands him to disenchant her Brother and everyone else. The "arap" accompanies the twins and is the one to reveal the intrigue to their father, and is relieved of his duty afterwards.

Dilrukesch
In a variant collected by Turkologist Georg Jacob with the title Dilrukesch, a king forbids lighting a candle at night. However, three poor spinner sisters disobey the ban and keep working by candlelight for three nights. The king goes to their house to investigate and listens to their conversation: the elder sister wants to marry the king's cook to eat the best dishes, the middle sister the king's dressmaker to wear the finest garments, and the youngest the king himself, for she will bear him children whose smiles will produce rosebuds and whose tears will produce pearls. The king marries the youngest, to the elder sisters' jealousy, and she bears twins, a boy and a girl. The elder sister and the midwife replace them for puppies and cast them in the water, but they are saved by the king's gardener. Learning of their survival, the midwife convinces the gardener's wife to abandon the twins in a cave the woods. A doe suckles the twins and they grow up. The boy sells the pearls his sister produces with her tears. One day, the midwife goes to the cave and tells the girl about the thistle (German: Distel) of a woman named Dilrukesch Hanym, her mirror that reflects the whole world, and lastly about Dilrukesch herself. The boy brings the objects to the cave and marries Dilrukesch, daughter of the Peri king. Dilrukesch reveals the truth during a banquet with the king.

The Padishah and the Three Girls
In another tale, collected from the Turkish population of Vidin with the title "Падишах и три девушки" ("The Padishah and the Three Girls"), a padishah forbids lighting any light at night. Three orphans girls disobey the ban, since they have to work overnight to earn their living. Meanwhile, the padishah himself is listening to their conversation about their wishes to marry the padishah: the elder sister promises to weave a carpet large enough for the army and the people to sit, and there would still be room left; the middle one that she can prepare a cauldron of pilava to feed the army and the people, and there would still be half cauldron left; and the youngest promises to bear twins, a boy with a moon on the front and a girl with the sun. The padishah marries the first sister and, after three months, orders her to fulfill her boast. She fails and is banished to the goose barn. The marries the next sister and, after another three months, orders her to prepare the cauldron of food. She also fails and joins her sisters. Finally, the ruler marries the third sister and she bears the twins the promises after nine months. Learning of their cadette's luck, the sisters bribe the midwife to replace the babies for puppies and cast them in the sea. Thinking his wife lied about her children, the padishah orders her to be buried at a crossroads and spat on. Meanwhile, the twins are saved and raised by a dervish. On his deathbed, the dervish gives a magical ring, whip, cap and sheepskin to the male twin. After he dies, the male twin uses the ring to summon an Arab servant, who takes them to the padishah's city, where They rent a house. Their jealous aunts learn of this and ask the midwife for come up with a plan. The midwife pays the twins a visit and each time tells them about a treasure they have to seek: a white poplar tree whose leaves ring and play music, a bird that chirps, and their owner, a woman named Naylanim. On his quest to find Naylanim, the male twin helps a nest of birds, and their father, the bird Zumranka, gives him some of its feathers. The male twin reaches Naylanim's tower, and she curses him to be turned to stone everytime she shouts from her tower. The male twin uses the Zumranka's feather to restore himself. Defeated, Naylanim joins the male twin and they make their way to the padishah's city. Naylanim convinces the youth to prepare a wedding and invite the padishah and everyone. During dinner, Naylanim shows the twins' astral birthmarks to their father, the padishah.

The Sun Girl 
In a tale collected by folklorist  with the title Güneş Kızı ("The Sun Girl"), a rich man's two elder sons are already married, the first to a vizier's daughter, the second to a poor girl, but the youngest declares he does not wish to marry. One day, he takes his horse to the fountain, and overhears the conversation between three sisters: the elder two want to marry to have a comfortable life, while their cadette says that being mother to a boy and a girl with silken hair and teeth of pearl would make her happy. The third son goes back home and says he found his fiancée: the shepherd's third daughter. Both their families consent to their marriage, and the shepherd's daughter tells she wants her sisters to live with them. The girl's husband reminds her of her words at the fountain, and expects her to giv birth to her promised children. Nine months later, she gives birth to twins, a boy and a girl. However, the girl's elder sisters, envying her happiness, bribe a midwife to replace the babies for puppies and cast them in the water. The girl's husband, tricked by the sisters-in-law's deception, and orders his wife to be buried in the crossroads up to the torse and to be spat on by the people. Meanwhile, aat a distance, a shepherd is grazing his sheep and notices one of them has lost milk from its udders, and investigates the next day: the same sheep has found the twins near the river and has been suckling them. The shepherd takes the twins to raise as his own with his wife. Years later, when the twins grow up, they decide to leabve ther adoptive parents' house and buy another house for themselves in another palce. They settle into a routine: the female twin stays at home while the male twin hunts game. One day, he hunts an agile deer and gives a carcass to a hunting retinue and their leader, his father. The man goes back home and comments how he saw a youth with silken hair and teeth of pearl, to the sisters-in-law's horror. The twins' aunts hire a sorceres to get rid of the twins: while the male twin is away, the sorceress pays a visit to the female twin, and first talks about castor leaves from a tree in Kafdag that produce sound live instruments; then about the Sun Girl in the Indian land. With the help of a magic snow-white horse, he gets the leaves, and is warned by a dev-mother that the Sun Girl's land is filled with stones - people who tried and failed to get her. Despite the danger, the youth soldiers on: he is to dig a trench on the ground, fill it water and wait for the coming of 39 pigeons that will become maidens, and a 40th one that is the Sun Girl; he is to steal her clothes. Failing twice, but being saved by the dev-mother, he gets the Sun Girl, undoes the stone curse on her victims, and brings the maiden to his house. After a while, his hunter father meets the youth again and invites him to the coffee house for a drink. After the meeting, the Sun Girl advises the twins to meet their mother at the crossroads, caress and wash her face, then at dinner with the twins' father, reveals the whole truth.

Çember Has Güzel 
In a tale collected from Sivas with the title Çember Has Güzel, a man has three daughters. One day, they begin to talk among themselves about marrying the padishah: the elder boasts she can weave a rug for the whole army to sit, and half would still be left over; the middle one that she can sew a tent large enough to house the entire army and there would still be space left; and the youngest promises to bear him twins, a boy with golden hair and a girl with silver hair. The padishah, who has been listening to their conversation, the next day orders his vizier to send for the girls so he can marry all three. Time passes, and the padishah questions the two elder sisters about their promises, who try to defend themselves by saying that much time has passed; while the youngest asks him to wait nine months for the twins' birth. And so it happens: a boy and a girl are born to the third sister, while the elders become greatly concerned about their fate and consult with a sorceress. She tells them to take the children and replace them for puppies. The third sisters is banishes form the palace. Years pass, and the padishah happen to meet the twins by chance during a walk and tell his co-wives about it. They returns to the old woman, who takes the children nand hide them in a cave up the mountains, but this still leads to a chance encounter between father and children. The old woman, urged by the sisters to get rid of them, pays a visit to the twins' cave dwelling and tells the female twin about wonders: first, about a saz guarded by a seven-headed giant; later, about a magical maiden named Çember Has Güzel. He gets the saz first, then rides to find the maiden, and meets an old man on the road, who warns him that many have gone to her lands and turned to stone, and he may suffer the same fate. Undeterred, the youth marches on until he finds a basin next to a yellow stone, then shouts Çember Has Güzel's name three times, each time a part of his body becoming stone. After the third time, he resists the spell and Çember Has Güzel comes out of the rock to greet him, and goes back with him to his sister's cave. At he end of the tale, the padishah pays a visit to the twins in the cave, and invites them for a meal at the palace. During the banquet, Çember Has Güzel tries to feed a dead rooster a bit of rice, and is questioned by the padishah. She retorts it is strange for a dead rooster to eat rice, and so it is a human woman giving birth to puppies. With this, the maiden tells the monarch the twins are his children.

Three Sisters 
In a Turkish tale from Çukurova with the title Üç Bacı ("Three Sisters"), a padishah marries three sisters after they promise great feats, the youngest promising to bear twins, a boy and a girl with hair half of gold and half of silver. The elder sisters fail to deliver, while the youngest gives birth to her children, which are taken from her by her jealous sisters and replaced for puppies. Tricked into thinking his third wife lies to him, he orders her to he placed at a crossroads with the dogs at her side, and for everyone to spit on her, on penalty of physical punishment to those that disobey the order. The children are saved and grow up together. One day, the elder sisters notice that their nephews are alive and send a sorceress to their house. The sorceress pays a visit to the female twin when the male twin is away and tells her about a fairy maiden named Nurşen Hanım and her possessions: her fishes, a light source, her gazelle and her grayhound. The male twin goes after the maiden's objects and lastly for the fairy, who has petrifying powers. The youth succeeds in his quest and brings everything to their home. Nurşen Hanım marries the male twin and reveals the truth to the padishah.

Zülfü Mavi 
In a Turkish tale titled Zülfü Mavi, a sultan has three daughters, and each of them wishes to marry the sons of another sultan. The elder wants to marry the elder son, and boasts she can weave a carpet large enough for the people to seat, and there would be space left. The sultan's elder son overhears it and takes her for his wife. Next, the middle sister boasts she can cook food for the whole people in eggshells, and there would be food left. The middle son overhears it and takes her as his wife. Lastly, the youngest sister promises to bear twins, a girl with silver hair and teeth of pearl, and a boy with silver hair and teeth of gold. The sultan's youngest son marries her. However, marital life is not an easy one: the second sultan's elder sons questions their respective wives about their boasts, and the girls dismiss their husbands' concerns, while their cadette does give birth to her promised twins, to their jealousy. They hire a witch to take the children and abandon them in the wilderness, and replace them for puppies. The sultan's youngest son falls for the deception and banishes his wife at a crossroads. Meanwhile, the children are found by a shepherd near a bush when he notices that one of his she-goats has its udders drained of its milk. The shepherd takes the twins and raises them with his wife, and, whenever they wash them, their bathwater turns to gold, which they sell. After becoming rich enough, they build a house in the mountains, and the twins fall into a routine: the female twin stays home, while the male twin goes hunting. After a while, their aunts realize the twins are alive, and send the witch to get rid of them. The witch pays a visit to the female twin and convinces her to find Zülfü Mavi that can play the strings on a saz and amuse her. The male twin rides a horse to Zülfü Mavi and shouts three times for them to come out, each time his body turning to stone. The third time, the spell dissipates, and the youth takes some water from a basin and sprinkles it on the stones, releasing Zülfü Mavi's previous victims. Zülfü Mavi goes with the youth to the twins' house, and later joins them for a banquet with the sultan, the twins' father. During the banquet, Zülfü Mavi orders a golden rooster to eat golden barley, and states the sight is just as strange as a human woman giving birth to animals.

From the Uysal-Walker Archive 
In a Turkish tale collected from a female teller from Malatya, in 1990, and archived in the Uysal–Walker Archive of Turkish Oral Narrative with the title The Abused Youngest Sister, three sisters wish to marry the padishah: the first claims she can make a huge meal for the padishah and his army, the second that she can sew a tent for the whole army and the third that she can bear a boy and a girl, one of them with golden hair and the other with silver hair. The elder sisters renege on theirs claims and try to humiliate their youngest before she gives birth. After she gives birth to three children, two boys and a girl in three consecutive pregnancies, the sisters replace them for a pup and two kittens and throw them in the river. Years later, the siblings are sent for a magic tree that talks and sings and belongs to a fairy woman anamed Ahelifim-Vahelifim, and lastly for the fairy woman herself.

In another Turkish variant from the Uysal-Walker Archive, collected from teller Gülşah Gülen from Kars Province in 1977 and titled The Persecuted Wife, the third sister promises to bear twins with golden hair and pearly teeth. The twins are raised by a couple of giants and given the names Şah Ǐsmail (the boy) and Mihriban (the girl). The aunts send them for the "saçlı fırak", the laughing rose (güllü kahkaha) and lastly for their owner, a woman named Güllüzar Hanım.

Other tales
French orientalist Albert Socin collected a Turkish tale from the city of Mardin. In this tale, the king forbids lighting any fire at night, and, the next evening, he wanders incognito through the streets of his kingdom, until he sights an illuminated house in the distance. The king goes to peer through the window and sees three sisters talking: the elder promises to weave a tent large enough to cover the whole army, the middle sisters that she can sew a carpet large enough for the whole army, and the youngest promises to give birth to a boy with locks of gold and silver. The king marries the first sister and asks her about the tent; she answers that the tent is the firmament itself. The king then marries the middle sister and asks her about the carpet; she answers that the carper is the ground itself. The king then marries the third sister, who does deliver the child she promised. The jealous sister take the boy and cast him into the sea in a box. He is saved by a fisherman and his wife;  whenever the boy is bathed, the bathwater turns to gold.

Johannes Østrup summarized a tale published by both Kúnos and William Radloff, and titled Pjaltekræmmersken. In this tale, the sultan bans lighting candles at night. He goes with the vizir to check on the only house that is still illuminated, and listens to the conversations between three sisters: the youngest says she wants to marry the sultan and bear him twins, a boy and a girl with teeth of pearl and golden hair. Years later, a witch sends the boy on a quest for a sewing needle, a magic mirror and a fairy woman named Bilal.

See also 
 Zarlik and Munglik

References 

Turkish fairy tales
Female characters in fairy tales
Fictional twins
Twins in fiction
ATU 700-749